Rokas Kostiuškevičius (born 1990) is a Lithuanian balloonist.

In 2012 Marijampolė hosted first World Junior Championships, where Kostiuškevičius won. In 2012 World Championships for seniors he finished in 27th place.

In 2013 European Championships he won the overall competition, ahead of his father Rimas Kostiuškevičius, who won silver.

References 

1990 births
Living people
Sportspeople from Marijampolė
Lithuanian balloonists